Utah State Parks is the common name for the Division of Utah State Parks and Recreation; a division of the Utah Department of Natural Resources. This is the state agency that manages the state park system of the U.S. state of Utah.

Utah's state park system began with four heritage parks in 1957: Sugar House Park (which was later removed from the system), Utah Territorial Statehouse in Fillmore, This Is the Place Monument in Salt Lake City, and Camp Floyd outside of Lehi.
Utah's state parks are scattered throughout Utah; from Bear Lake State Park at the Utah/Idaho border to Edge of the Cedars State Park Museum deep in the Four Corners region, and everywhere in between.

The Division of Utah State Parks and Recreation also administers the Utah off highway vehicle, boating, and trails programs. In this capacity, they work to provide access to waterways and trails, and promote education, safety, and resource protection.

The division's mission statement is "To enhance the quality of life by preserving and providing natural, cultural, and recreational resources for the enjoyment, education, and inspiration of this and future generations."

See also

References

External links

 Utah State Parks (official website)
 Utah State Parks by the Utah Office of Tourism

 
State parks
Utah state parks
State parks